That's a Plenty is the second album by the American female vocal group the Pointer Sisters. It was released in 1974 on Blue Thumb Records. 

The album peaked at No. 82 on the Billboard 200.

History
Mixing the Pointers' brand of soul with rollicking blues numbers and jazz covers, the album also included the country-flavored "Fairytale", their second Top 40 hit. The song crossed over to the country charts, enabling the group to become the first African-American vocal group to perform at the Grand Ole Opry. The group won the Grammy Award for "Best Country Vocal Performance By A Duo Or Group".

The album was the second by the group to be certified gold. The album was remastered and issued on CD in 2006 by Hip-O Select.

Track listing

Personnel 
 Anita Pointer, Ruth Pointer, Bonnie Pointer, June Pointer – vocals

Musicians
 Tom Salisbury – keyboards, Silverton accordion (1), brass and string arrangements 
 Herbie Hancock – acoustic piano (2, 6); electric piano, Hohner clavinet and ARP synthesizer (9)
 David Briggs – acoustic piano (7)
 David Grisman – mandolin (1)
 Jesse Ed Davis – electric guitar (3)
 Jack Viertell – electric guitar (3)
 Bonnie Raitt – slide guitar (3)
 John Shine – guitar (4)
 Bobby Thompson – acoustic guitar (7)
 Weldon Myrick – pedal steel guitar (7)
 John Neumann – bass (1, 5, 8)
 Ron McClure – bass (2, 4, 6)
 Paul Jackson – bass (3, 9)
 Norbert Putnam – bass (7)
 Gaylord Birch – drums (1-6, 8, 9)
 Ken Buttrey – drums (7)
 Bill Summers – African talking drum, shekere and congas (9)
 Britt Woodman – trombone solo (4)
 Gordon Messick – trombone (5)
 Harry "Sweets" Edison – trumpet solo (4)
 James Goodwin – trumpet (5)
 Jim Rothermel – clarinet (5)
 Floyd Cooley – tuba (5)
 Buddy Spicher – fiddle (7)

Production 
 David Rubinson & Friends, Inc. – producer
 Tom Salisbury, Jeffrey Cohen, Bruce Good – associate producers
 Jeremy Zatkin, Fred Catero, David Rubinson – recording engineers
 George Horn, Phil Brown – mastering engineers
 David Rubinson – arrangements on "Grinning in Your Face" and "Black Coffee"
 Norman Landsberg, Jeffrey Cohen, Bruce Good – vocal arrangement on "Salt Peanuts"
 Randy Tuten – cover art
 Herb Greene – art direction, photography

Chart positions

References

External links
 

1974 albums
The Pointer Sisters albums
Albums produced by Dave Rubinson
Albums recorded at Wally Heider Studios
Blue Thumb Records albums